Rowan Wingate Robertson (born 22 November 1971) is an English rock guitarist who currently performs in the Las Vegas production show Raiding the Rock Vault and plays for Bang Tango. He also plays for DC4. Robertson also played guitar for AM Radio, Dio, Vast, and Violet's Demise. Robertson has also done work as a film composer for director Amber Moelter's Dirty Step Upstage and has filmed numerous instructional guitar videos.

Career

Dio (1989–1991)
Rowan Robertson was recruited to join the band Dio when he was only 17 years of age. The experience launched the young guitarist from obscurity to international fame nearly overnight. News that the band Dio had replaced departing guitarist Craig Goldy with an unusually young guitar player circulated in hard rock and heavy metal magazines such as Hit Parader, Rip, and Circus months before Robertson's first and only album with the band, Lock Up the Wolves, was released.

Recruitment, audition, announcement
As a Dio fan himself, Robertson became aware of Craig Goldy's departure from Dio after the band's Dream Evil album and subsequent tour. Robertson began an earnest effort to make contact with the band's management, asking for a chance to audition. His initial effort was unsuccessful. After reaching out to the band's label, Phonogram Records, (not long after seeing Dio with Craig Goldy on guitars live at the Monsters of Rock festival at Donington Castle, in the UK, in 1987), Robertson received a generic-in-nature response declining his request for a personal audition. Robertson persisted and reached out to Dio's official fan club, hoping to reach someone closer to and with stronger personal ties to the band's management. The latter effort proved successful. The band's fan club forwarded Robertson's demo, this time leading to an audition. At the beginning of 1989 Robertson was flown to Los Angeles for a formal audition with Ronnie James and Wendy Dio. A second audition led to an offer and an official announcement that Robertson was now the band's official new guitarist. Members of the press were invited to meet the new guitar player at Oliver's Pub, in New York City on 20 July 1989. Between the Oliver's Pub event and the release of Lock Up the Wolves, media focus on the promising new guitar player was significant.

Lock Up the Wolves
Lock Up the Wolves sessions initially included Jimmy Bain, Vinny Appice and Jens Johansson. This line-up had already written and recorded parts of Lock Up the Wolves before Bain and Appice were replaced with Teddy Cook and former AC/DC drummer Simon Wright, respectively. The album was released on 15 May 1990, and the band embarked on a tour in support of the album.

Lock Up the Wolves represented a clear evolution for Dio as a band. Ronnie James Dio replaced his band's entire line-up from its previous album, but only after working with them to some degree on what would eventually become Lock Up the Wolves. In this sense, the album was not an abrupt change from the band's previous work, but a protracted evolution in the band's sound that was ultimately delivered by one of the band's strongest line-ups. By 1990 and 1991 the music industry would go through a pretty dramatic shift as Grunge began to make a commercially aggressive appearance in the music scene: Soundgarden, Alice in Chains, Screaming Trees, had already been signed to major labels and had performed well commercially by then.

Second album with Dio shelved
Robertson's tenure in Dio was cut short by music industry persistence for a Ronnie James Dio reunion with Black Sabbath. In 1991 it was announced that the highly anticipated reunion would take place. At that time, the band, including Robertson, had been writing songs for an upcoming album that had been scheduled for a May 1991 release. Once a Black Sabbath reunion with Ronnie James Dio was announced, what would have been Robertson's second album with Dio was shelved. Robertson has confirmed the existence of rehearsal recordings for what would have been the follow-up to Lock Up the Wolves but he has stated these will remain archived and he does not feel comfortable releasing any of this to the public, maintaining he would have only done that with permission from Ronnie James Dio himself.

Reunion with Ronnie James Dio unrealised
A Robertson reunion with Dio, which many fans had hoped for did not materialise before the singer's health declined, and he died in May 2010. A reunion nearly took place in 2001 when Robertson was scheduled to replace Craig Goldy on tour in South Africa in support of Dio's then-new album Magica after Goldy suffered an injury. However the September 11 attacks affected the band's tour plans. A second stint for Robertson in Dio never materialised.

After Dio (1991–present)
When Dio was put on ice due to the Ronnie James Dio-Black Sabbath reunion, Rowan Robertson began pursuing two new projects: work on an instruction video for guitar players and a new band with vocalist Oni Logan (formerly of Lynch Mob) and drummer Jimmy Paxson. They began to record an album for Atlantic Records, but it was not released by the label at that time. Atlantic Records eventually released the album – titled Revisited – in 2002 under a different band name: Logan-Robertson. After Violet's Demise, Robertson spent three years doing session work in Los Angeles, as well as some work in Japan, where he toured briefly.

Robertson then worked with the VAST (Visual Audio Sensory Theater), founded and fronted by Jon Crosby, on the tour supporting the project's first album. VAST took a theatrical approach to performances. Although Robertson played live with the band after they had released their first album and he contributed to the development of the second VAST release, Music for People, he parted ways with VAST due to creative differences. Much of the work Robertson contributed to VAST was on rhythm guitars, while Robertson is specifically known for a wide range of ability spanning strong rhythm and lead guitars.

Robertson was recruited by Kevin Ridel and Weezer's Rivers Cuomo. Having relocated to Los Angeles during his Dio years, Robertson was intimately connected to the music scene that was developing and beginning to diversity the airwaves following the heavy rotation of grunge artists that began to wane following the genre's own peak in the late 1990s. Throughout this time, Robertson continued working with Violet's Demise's Oni Logan – a collaboration that would eventually pave the way for the latent release of Violet's Demise's debut album, which had been shelved years earlier. The band's first full-length album, produced by Rivers Cuomo, Radioactive, was released on Elektra in 2003. It included the singles "Taken for a Ride" and "I Just Wanna Be Loved." "I Just Wanna Be Loved" was featured on the WB television series Smallville, and released on the show's soundtrack. Also in 2003, "Taken for a Ride" was featured on the video game soundtrack for EA Sports' John Madden Football 2003. The band received more support from WB when "Taken for a Ride" was featured on an episode of One Tree Hill. The song also appeared on a television trailer for the FOX feature film The Girl Next Door that same year.

One of Robertson's more obscure projects is a band called Happy Birthday. In April 2005 Robertson embarked on a short West Coast tour with Happy Birthday, supporting Jimmy Chamberlin's band, The Jimmy Chamberlin Complex, according to Robertson's biography on a page for the firm that represents the artist legally.

In 2005 Robertson also began collaboration on a project called Wicked Outlaw. "The new band, featuring guitarist Rowan Robertson and Finnish composer and bassist Marko Pukkila (formerly of Altaria)," was "writing original material" and was expected to debut and tour the United States and Europe 
in 2006 according to Blabbermouth.net. Initial gestures to organise Wicked Outlaw actually dated back to as early as May 2004 and was known to be looking for a singer and drummer. Although the current status of Wicked Outlaw is unknown, Robertson has never stated that work on this project has concluded.

DC4 originally featured Shawn Duncan (of Odin) on drums, Matt Duncan on bass, and Jeff Duncan (of Armored Saint and Odin) on vocals and guitar. DC4 released their debut album, Volume 1, with guitarist Hyland Church in 2002. Rowan joined the band in 2006 as a replacement for Church and featured on the band's second album, Explode, in 2007. Robertson also appeared on their third album, Electric Ministry in 2011.

As of 2014, Rowan Robertson is a member of Bang Tango.

Other work
Since May 2011, Rowan Robertson has served as a columnist for Intense Guitar and Bass magazine. He has also teamed up with longtime Black Sabbath keyboardist Geoff Nicholls, Nils Patrik Johanson and others in a band called The Southern Cross. The band focuses on Black Sabbath and Dio material that none of the other original members of those bands are playing any more.

Discography

With Dio
Lock Up the Wolves (1990)

With DC4
Explode (2007)
Electric Ministry (2011)
Atomic Highway (2018)

With Ian Ray Logan & Serpent's Ride
Between Lights and Shadows" (2016)

Videography
 Star Licks Master Sessions: Simon Wright (2000)
 Star Licks: Speed Picking Star Licks Master Sessions: Rowan Robertson Rowan Robertson: Speed PickingFilmography
 Dirty Step Upstage'' (Film Score) (2009)

References

External links
Rowan Robertson's official website
 DC4 Official Website
 The Official Rowan Robertson Facebook Page
Official Dio/Ronnie James Dio Website
 "Dirty Step Upstage" Official Film Website

1971 births
Living people
English rock guitarists
English heavy metal guitarists
English rock singers
English heavy metal singers
Dio (band) members
People from Cambridge
Lead guitarists
Musicians from Cambridgeshire
Sin City Sinners members